Steven Paul Sumner  (2 April 1955 – 8 February 2017) was an English-born, New Zealand football player, who was captain of the national team during the country's first successful campaign to qualify for the World Cup, in 1982.

Club career
Sumner began his football as an apprentice at Blackpool before moving to New Zealand in 1973 to play for Christchurch United, winning the National League in his first year. Sumner went on to win 6 Chatham Cups and 5 league titles. He is the only player to have won six Chatham Cup winners medals.

International career
His international career spanned from 1976 to 1988, including a record 105 appearances for New Zealand (beating the record previously held by Brian Turner), 58 of which were A-internationals.

An active and attacking midfielder, Sumner scored a national record six goals during New Zealand's 13–0 defeat of Fiji during the 1982 World Cup qualifying campaign. He was also one of New Zealand's only two scorers in the 1982 World Cup Finals tournament in Spain (along with Steve Wooddin), in New Zealand's 5–2 loss to Scotland. He was the first player of the FIFA Oceania zone to score in a World Cup.

In 1991, he was inducted into the New Zealand Soccer Media Association Hall of Fame and was then awarded FIFA's top award, the FIFA Order of Merit, before the opening of the 2010 FIFA World Cup, along with Johan Cruyff and former South African president Thabo Mbeki.

Later life and death
After retiring Sumner maintained his involvement in football, being employed by TVNZ as a media personality. More significantly he sat on the Executive Board of the Wellington Phoenix bringing much needed professional playing experience to the table. In August 2015, he was diagnosed with prostate cancer, from which he died on 8 February 2017, aged 61.

Steve Sumner Trophy
In 2018 New Zealand Football named the Man of the Match trophy for the New Zealand Football Championship final after Sumner, calling it the "Steve Sumner Trophy". It was first awarded to Callum McCowatt after he scored the only goal in Auckland City 1–0 win over Team Wellington in the final. McCowatt won it a second time the following year, this time while playing for Eastern Suburbs, where he scored a hattrick in the finals, again against Team Wellington.

Honours

Individual

Player of the Year: 1983
Golden Boot: 1983
FIFA Centennial Award in 2004
FIFA Order of Merit: 2010
Friends of Football Medal of Excellence 2015 
Officer of the New Zealand Order of Merit (for services to football), 2016 Queen's Birthday Honours
IFFHS Oceania Men's Team of All Time: 2021

Club
Christchurch United
National League: 1973, 1975, 1978, 1988
Chatham Cup: 1974, 1975, 1976, 1989

Manurewa
National League: 1983
Chatham Cup: 1984

Gisborne City
Chatham Cup: 1987

References

External links
New Zealand 1982 World Cup squad
Planet World Cup interview

1955 births
2017 deaths
English expatriate footballers
English footballers 
English emigrants to New Zealand
Expatriate association footballers in New Zealand
National Soccer League (Australia) players
Naturalised citizens of New Zealand
New Zealand international footballers
New Zealand association footballers
West Adelaide SC players
Manurewa AFC players
Gisborne City AFC players
Officers of the New Zealand Order of Merit
Christchurch United players
Newcastle KB United players
Association football midfielders
Deaths from prostate cancer
Deaths from cancer in New Zealand
1980 Oceania Cup players
1982 FIFA World Cup players
New Zealand expatriate sportspeople in England